Wermelskirchen (Ripuarian: Wärmelßkirrshe) is a town in the Rheinisch-Bergischer Kreis, in North Rhine-Westphalia, Germany, southeast of Remscheid. It is home to one of Europe's biggest live Christmas trees (measuring 26m).

Coat of arms

The coat-of-arms of the city of Wermelskirchen looks like a silver shield split into thirds.  In the left field is an oak tree.  In the right field there is a Swan and pictured in the middle field there is a church.

Education
Wermelskirchen has an Evangelical, a Roman Catholic church and a Latin school.

Economy
The city has the head office of OBI and the origin of the caster manufacturer TENTE.

Twin towns – sister cities

Wermelskirchen is twinned with:
 Forst, Germany
 Loches, France

Notable people
Carl Leverkus (1804–1889), founder of a German chemical and pharmaceutical company and the namesake of the city of Leverkusen
Uwe Boll (born 1965), film director and writer, restaurateur and founder of Bauhaus Restaurant chains in Canada
Thomas Kleine (born 1977), footballer
Christian Lindner (born 1979), politician

Honorary citizens
 1876: Ludwig von Bohlen
 1884: Carl Leverkus
 1895: Otto von Bismarck
 1933: Paul von Hindenburg

References

External links

Official website 
Website of the borough Dabringhausen 

Towns in North Rhine-Westphalia
Districts of the Rhine Province